Sharon Lee Stewart  (born 17 August 1965) is a retired Australian middle-distance runner who specialised in the 800 metres. She represented her country at one outdoor and one indoor World Championships. In addition, she won the bronze medal at the 1990 Commonwealth Games.

Her personal bests in the event are 2:00.17 outdoors (Oslo 1991) and 2:03.98	indoors (Seville 1991).

International competitions

1Representing Oceania
2Did not finish in the semifinals

References

External links
Sharon Stewart at Australian Athletics Historical Results

Living people
1965 births
Australian female sprinters
Australian female middle-distance runners
World Athletics Championships athletes for Australia
Commonwealth Games bronze medallists for Australia
Commonwealth Games silver medallists for Australia
Commonwealth Games medallists in athletics
Athletes (track and field) at the 1986 Commonwealth Games
Athletes (track and field) at the 1990 Commonwealth Games
21st-century Australian women
20th-century Australian women
Medallists at the 1986 Commonwealth Games
Medallists at the 1990 Commonwealth Games